Ely Valley may refer to:

The valley of the River Ely in South Wales surrounded by the communities of Tonyrefail, Gilfach Goch, Llantrisant, Pontyclun, Llanharan and Llanharry
A community sports park in Tonyrefail
Ely Valley Railway, a Welsh railway line